A cystourethrectomy or cysto-urethrectomy is a surgical procedure in which the urinary bladder and urethra are removed.  The procedure combines a cystectomy and a urethrectomy.

See also 
 List of surgeries by type

References

Surgical oncology
Surgical removal procedures
Male genital surgery